Euphaea fraseri, Malabar torrent dart, is a species of damselfly in the family Euphaeidae. This species is endemic to the Western Ghats; known to occur in various locations up to Goa.

Description and habitat
It is a medium sized damselfly with black head and brown-capped pale grey eyes. Its thorax is black, marked with sky-blue antehumeral and reddish-yellow humeral stripes. Lateral sides of the thorax in the base is red. Legs are red as in Euphaea cardinalis; but first pair is dark. Wings are narrower than Euphaea cardinalis; hind-wings are shorter than fore-wings. Fore-wings are transparent, merely enfumed with brown on the apices. Hind-wings are transparent; but one third of the wings from the apices are broadly black. Abdomen is bright red up to the segment 7; apical third of segment 7 to the end segment are black. Anal appendages are black.

Female is short and robust; the ochreous-red of male is replaced with yellow colors. All wings are transparent, enfumed with black in adults. Abdomen is black with yellow lateral stripes up to segment 6. The yellow lateral stripes continued to segment 7. Segment 8 has a narrow and 9 has a broad yellow apical annule, covering dorsal half.

They breed in hill streams but at a lower elevation. Males usually found on low herbage along the banks or middle of the streams.

See also 
 List of odonates of India
 List of odonata of Kerala

References

External links

Euphaeidae
Insects described in 1920